Yarona may refer to:

 Yarona (album), a 1995 album by Abdullah Ibrahim
 Yarona FM, a radio station based in Gaborone, Botswana
 Yarona, a bus rapid transit system in Rustenburg, South Africa